The discography of Lumidee, a Puerto Rican-American hip hop and R&B recording artist, consists of ten singles, eleven music videos, two studio albums and some other appearances.

Lumidee quickly rose to fame during the summer of 2003 with the release of her debut single, "Never Leave You (Uh Oooh, Uh Oooh)", which was her only hit until the 2007 release of "She's Like the Wind". On June 23, 2003, she released her debut album, Almost Famous. For the next few years, Lumidee was not in the mainstream music industry in the US, instead veering more towards reggaeton and dancehall music. After her hit single "Never Leave You", Lumidee went overseas to continue her musical career in Belgium, Germany, France and the Netherlands.

On April 17, 2007, Lumidee released her second album Unexpected, which was released under TVT Records. The US single "She's Like the Wind" peaked at 43, but it was not released in Europe. There, the label released the single "Crazy" featuring Pitbull, which experienced moderate chart success in Germany, Austria and the UK.

Albums

Studio albums

Mixtapes
 I'm Up, Vol. 1 (2009)
 Coast 2 Coast Exclusive, Vol. 2 (2009)
 Lumi (2014)

Singles

As lead artist

As featured artist

Album appearances

Music videos

References

Discography
Discographies of American artists
Hip hop discographies
Rhythm and blues discographies